Martuk (Märtök) is a village and the administrative center of  Martuk district of Aktobe Region in Kazakhstan. It is located at a height of 181 m above sea level.

Population
At the 2012 census, Martuk had a population of 9513.

References

Populated places in Aktobe Region